Robert Johnson was an Anglican bishop in Ireland during the mid-18th century.

Johnson was educated at Trinity College, Dublin. He was Rector of Dungannon until 1756 when he was appointed Dean of Tuam. In 1759 he became Bishop of Cloyne, a post he held until his death in January 1767.

References

Alumni of Trinity College Dublin
Deans of Tuam
Bishops of Cloyne
1767 deaths
Year of birth missing